Global Closure Systems is a privately owned French factory network which produces closures for beverage containers and other purposes.  It operates from 21 plants globally under various brand names, including Astra Plastique, Bender, Massmould, Obrist, UCP and Zeller Plastik.

History

The company was created as a result of the purchase by PAI Partners, a French private equity firm, of the closures business previously operated by Crown Holdings Inc for $750 million.

Packaging giant RPC Group plc is set to significantly extend its global presence after it announced plans to buy Global Closure Systems for 650 million euros ($714.6 million).

The deal, which is subject to shareholder and regulatory approval, was scheduled to be complete by the end of March.

References

External links
Official home page 

Manufacturing companies of France